13th Lux Style Awards

Official Poster 
Date: 
4 December 2014 
 
Host: 
Moomal Sheikh

Venue: 
Mövenpick, Karachi, Sindh, Pakistan

Film 
Zinda Bhaag

Television Serial – Satellite: 
Daagh

Television Serial – Terrestrial: 
Mar Jayen Hum tu Kiya

Music Album: 
Yaran Di Toli
 
←12th Lux Style Awards 14th→

The 13th Lux Style Awards was a 2014 event presented by Lux to honor the fashion, music, films and Pakistani television of 2013. Ceremony was held on 4 December 2014 in a private ceremony, for the first in the thirteen years of LUX, event wasn't televised.

Winners and nominees
Following are the winners (in bold) and nominees for the 13th Lux Style Awards:

Film

Television

Music

Fashion

See also
 2nd Hum Awards
 1st ARY Film Awards

References

External links 

 Lux Style Awards official website 

Lux Style Awards ceremonies
2014 film awards
2014 television awards
2014 music awards
Lux
Lux
Lux